Kaczory may refer to the following places in Poland:
 Kaczory, Gmina Wiśniew in Masovian Voivodeship (east-central Poland)
 Kaczory, Gmina Wodynie in Masovian Voivodeship (east-central Poland)
 Kaczory, Ostrów Wielkopolski County in Greater Poland Voivodeship (west-central Poland)
 Kaczory, Piła County in Greater Poland Voivodeship (west-central Poland)
 Kaczory, Warmian-Masurian Voivodeship (north Poland)